Sorung Chhabise is a village in Katari Municipality. As per the previous structuring it was a village development committee in Udayapur District in the Sagarmatha Zone of south-eastern Nepal. At the time of the 1991 Nepal census it had a population of 3251 people living in 567 individual households.

References

External links
UN map of the municipalities of Udayapur District

Populated places in Udayapur District